Raven is a 1996 American direct-to-video action film starring Burt Reynolds.

Cast
 Burt Reynolds as Jerome "Raven" Katz
 Matt Battaglia as Martin "Duce" Grant
 Krista Allen as Cali Goodwin
 David Ackroyd as Bill Gilley
 Richard Gant as Russ Carlson
 Angela Harry as Eva
 Walter Olkewicz as Bernie DeFrewd
 Christopher Mayer as Hub
 Madison Mason as Governor Sklar
 Kim Chase as Sharon
 Charles Wahlheim as Ablin
 Michael Saad as Adeeb
 Charles Walker as Al Ryan
 Peter Savard as Senator Berg
 Mike White as Mike
 Steve Decker as Steve
 Lauren Hays as Sexy Brunette In Limo
 Julie Bilotta as Sexy Jogger
 Avalon Anders as Marsha (uncredited)

Premise
A secret government agency known as Four Star Group has send a team of black-ops soldiers into Bosnia. Their mission is to retrieve a top secret piece of military hardware. On their way home "Raven" (Burt Reynolds) decides to go into business for himself. Raven plans to sell the device on the black market. Raven tries to convince his partner "Duce" (Matt Battaglia) to sellout as well. Duce refuses effectively ending their friendship and leaving Raven no choice to terminate Duce. Duce escapes with the device and refuses to give it to Four Star Group. Upon arriving back stateside Raven assembles a team of ex-special forces soldiers to help him eliminate Four Star Group. Raven even tracks down Duce asking if he would like to bury the hatchet and help him take out their former employers. Duce again declines Raven's offer. Which doesn't sit well with Raven. Placing the two of them on a direct collision course with one another.

Production
The film was originally called Raven Team. Reynolds said he changed every one of his lines in the script. "The really talented ones understand it's a collaborative effort and if you say something funny they say, 'I wrote that.'" He added, "This movie is very much a copy of that Travolta movie, Broken Arrow... I play the Travolta part. It's a part I can play. It's my part, my persona. And if you play a pink flamingo, you can play one for life, if it's a hit."

In addition to attending the Burt Reynolds Institute for Film and Theatre, co-star Battaglia was a personal acquaintance and protégé of Reynolds, due to a friendship the veteran actor had struck with his father Carmello Battaglia during their days as college football teammates. Battaglia had already appeared next to Reynolds on several occasions, including a two-episode role on Evening Shade. But according to him, the star was unaware that he had been cast in Raven until the beginning of the shoot. The two would co-star again in two made-for-television Universal Soldier sequels in 1998.

References

External links
 

1996 films
1996 direct-to-video films
1996 action films
American action films
American direct-to-video films
Films scored by Harry Manfredini
1990s English-language films
1990s American films